This page lists the city flags in Oceania. It is a part of the Lists of city flags, which is split into continents due to its size.

Australia

Historical

French Polynesia

Hawaii

Historical

Marshall Islands

Micronesia

New Zealand

Palau

Papua New Guinea

Solomon Islands

Vanuatu

See also 
 List of city flags in Africa
 List of city flags in Asia
 List of city flags in Europe
 List of city flags in North America
 List of city flags in South America

Notes

References

External links 
 Australia: Local government area flags of Argentina by Flags of the World.
 Fiji: Municipal flags of Fiji by Flags of the World.
 Guam: Municipal flags of Guam by Flags of the World.
 Marshall Islands: Municipal flags of Marshall Islands by Flags of the World.
  New Caledonia: Municipal flags of New Caledonia by Flags of the World.
  New Zealand: Territorial Authority flags of  New Zealand by Flags of the World.